Yeung Pak-long (born 14 February 1995; also known as Brian Yeung) is a Hong Kong tennis player.

Yeung has a career high ATP singles ranking of 940 achieved on 24 August 2020 and a career high ATP doubles ranking of 394, achieved on 6 August 2018.

Yeung has represented Hong Kong at the Davis Cup, where he has a win–loss record of 2–4.

External links

Yeung Pak-long at Harvard University

1995 births
Living people
Hong Kong male tennis players
Harvard Crimson men's tennis players
Tennis players at the 2014 Asian Games
Tennis players at the 2018 Asian Games
Universiade medalists in tennis
Universiade medalists for Hong Kong
Asian Games competitors for Hong Kong
Medalists at the 2017 Summer Universiade